Văleni is a commune in Dâmbovița County, Muntenia, Romania with a population of 2,909 people. It is composed of two villages, Văleni-Dâmbovița (the commune center) and Mesteacăn.

References

Communes in Dâmbovița County
Localities in Muntenia